Prem Aggan (meaning:- The fire of love) is a 1998 Indian Hindi-language romantic film written and directed by Feroz Khan. The film stars Fardeen Khan and Meghna Kothari and Shama Sikander. Fardeen is Feroz's son who made his debut in the film, he got the Filmfare Award for Best Male Debut for his role. The film bombed at the box office but gained cult status for being so bad it's good.

Plot

Cast
Fardeen Khan as Suraj Singh
Meghna Kothari as Sapna Kumar
Sameer Malhotra as Vishal Kumar
Shama Sikander as Pooja
Sanjay Bhatia
Anupam Kher as Jai Kumar
Raj Babbar as Captain Veer Bahadur Singh
Beena as Sheena Kumar
Smita Jaykar as Seema Singh
Kamal Chopra as Sangha
Satish Shah as Principal Balan
Rakesh Bedi as Hiralal
Dinesh Hingoo as Motilal
Rammi Dhillon
Geetu Alaxander
Bobby Saini
Feroz Khan

Soundtrack

Reception
Syed Firdaus Ashraf of Rediff.com called the film ″Prem Agony″, stating ″There were a lot of expectations from this film, since Feroz Khan was betting his son's career on it. But the script and the music are ordinary; only the title song, Prem Aggan, is passable. ″Face it, guys and gals, Prem Aggan just isn't worth the trouble.″ 

Retrospectively, many reviewers put this film on the list of "worst movie ever made" for being "so bad it's good".

Fardeen Khan's performance was not well received yet he was awarded Filmfare Award for Best Male Debut for his performance. In 2022, during an interview, Khan stated ″I don't think I deserve that award. It was a culture and stuff back then, that people got awards like that. I look at my work, I definitely didn't deserve that. The film didn't work, I didn't work, I looked back and I thought I was horrible.″

References

External links

1990s Hindi-language films
Films directed by Feroz Khan
Films scored by Anu Malik
Indian romantic drama films